Alfons Pažur (13 March 1896 – 26 March 1973) was a Croatian footballer.

International career
He played in one match for the Yugoslavia national football team, away against Italy in 1925.

References

External links
 
 

1896 births
1973 deaths
People from Krapina-Zagorje County
People from the Kingdom of Croatia-Slavonia
Association football defenders
Yugoslav footballers
Yugoslavia international footballers
HŠK Concordia players